Chionodes fuscomaculella is a moth in the family Gelechiidae. It is found in North America, where it has been recorded from Nova Scotia and Quebec to Florida, south-western Wisconsin, eastern Texas and eastern Oklahoma.

The forewings are dusted with brown, aggregated into irregular spots and blotches.

The larvae feed on Quercus macrocarpa, Quercus rubra, Fagus grandifolia and Carya species.

References

Chionodes
Moths described in 1872
Moths of North America